The Euro Beach Soccer League (EBSL) is the premier competition in beach soccer contested between European men's national teams. The competition has been held annually since its establishment in 1998, making it the oldest beach soccer tournament in Europe and one of the oldest in the world, only surpassed in longevity by the World Cup and Mundialito events. The EBSL was originally created to promote the newly founded sport in Europe in a competitive environment and was originally called the European Pro Beach Soccer League until 2004.

Organised by Beach Soccer Worldwide (BSWW), the teams compete in two divisions; A, consisting of the league's 12 best nations and B, consisting of the other teams competing that year. A system of promotion and relegation exists between the two divisions.

The typical league format is played in two phases; a regular season and a post-season. Teams play in stages of fixtures during the regular season, hoping to earn enough points for their division's league table to qualify for their respective post-season events; for Division A, the Superfinal, in which league title is then directly contested, and for Division B, the Promotion Final, in which promotion to A is then directly contested.

The competition takes place between June and September. The league's rounds of matches are staged in a series of locations across Europe in which multiple nations gather to play, having spread as west as Dublin, Ireland and as east as Baku, Azerbaijan.  Matches take place every few weeks over the course of a weekend, including Fridays. At most, Division A teams play 10 games a season and Division B nations, 7 games.

38 nations of Europe have competed since the initial 1998 season. Only four have featured in every season – France, Italy, Portugal and Spain. The most successful nation is Portugal with eight titles, followed by Spain and Russia with five titles each. Italy and Switzerland have two titles (the latter are also current champions), whilst Germany, France and Ukraine have one title each.

History

Foundation
After beach soccer's inception in 1992, the sport grew quickly. In 1996, the Pro Beach Soccer Tour (PBST) was created by Beach Soccer Company (BSC) – a series of exhibition events across the world, totalling in 60 games by the end of 1997. In Europe, the interest generated was particularly prevalent. Unsatisfied with the status quo, representatives of six European beach soccer promoter entities met with the Graham family and Gabby Roe of BSC at Le Méridien hotel in Monte Carlo, Monaco, to discuss how to collectively grow the European game, namely Natalie Aubery (Monaco), Joël Cantona (France), Alex Colombo (Italy), Nicola Owen (Germany), Eric Steffan (Portugal), and Joan Cusco and Santi Soler (Spain). They perceived that the media, sponsors and fans in Europe desired a multi-event, summer-long competition, touring the continent with consistent national teams and star players to support in a competitive environment. Consequently, BSC proceeded to launch the first European Pro Beach Soccer League season (EPBSL) in 1998, moulded and structured as such.

Initial seasons (1998–2000)
In the inaugural season of 1998, seven countries took part, mostly from Western and Southern Europe – France, Spain, Germany, Italy, Yugoslavia, Switzerland and Portugal. The league events travelled across Europe, with multiple countries hosting rounds of fixtures called stages (see defunct formats for more), concluding in Monte Carlo, which saw Germany crowned champions – their only title to date. During this time, Prince Albert of Monaco became Honorary President of the EPBSL and Monte Carlo was chosen to host the final stage each year including a gala event. Spain went on to win the 1999 and 2000 editions, the latter famed for its conclusion with the title decided in the very last match of the season with the narrow 6–5 Spanish defeat of arch-rivals Portugal. Austria and the Netherlands also debuted during these years.

Much of the success of the league's early years is attributed to the recognisable retired association footballers who made the transition to the sand, attracting fans to attend and watch matches on TV. These included Eric Cantona, Michel, Claudio Gentile, Uli Stielike, Karl-Heinz Rummenigge, Emilio Butragueño and Andreas Brehme to name a few. Meanwhile, dedicated beach soccer players, without the footballing fame of these stars also made a name for themselves, most notably the young duo of Spain's Amarelle and Portugal's Madjer.

Introduction of the Superfinal and multiple divisions (2001–2005)
In 2001, thanks to a merger deal, Beach Soccer Worldwide (BSWW) became the league's new organisers. Subsequently, the competition underwent significant changes. The league was split into two phases – the existing regular season and a new post-season play-off phase called the Superfinal, in which the league champions would be determined instead of via the end of regular season league table. Furthermore, BSWW divided the nations of the league into two divisions (A and B) in 2002, with a short-lived third division (C) created in 2004 (see defunct formats for more). The league also doubled as the qualification route for European nations to the upcoming edition of the Beach Soccer World Championships.

Despite the new format, Iberian dominance continued initially. Spain claimed their third straight title in 2001, two-time runners-up Portugal finally claimed their first title in 2002, and Spanish superiority resumed as they won their fourth crown after just six seasons in 2003. However, such dominance ended with the results of 2004 and 2005 which finally saw new champions in France and Italy respectively, overcoming Spain and Portugal in the final of each respectively. Nations like England, Norway, Belgium, Poland, Hungary, Ukraine and Russia all joined the league during this period, expanding participation to more northern and eastern Europeans nations. However, they failed to make an impact against the superior, established Southern European quartet. Personnel-wise, European teams were quickly transitioning away from being composed of retired star footballers to comprising predominately younger players attempting a career in the new sport.

Commercially, the league enjoyed some of its greatest success at this time; BSWW secured "vastly expanded television coverage" of the EBSL from such networks as Sky Sports (UK), RAI (Italy), SIC (Portugal) and NRK (Norway) and "unprecedented demand from promoters" to host league events. Major sponsorship deals were also struck with McDonald's, Coca-Cola and MasterCard; in 2004, the competition was renamed to the shortened Euro Beach Soccer League (EBSL), and the latter became lead sponsors.

Third format era (2006–2007)
The EBSL once again underwent significant changes in 2006, entering its third distinct format era. In summary, the new format had Division B start and complete their regular season first, early in the summer. The top teams then qualified to play in Division A, to compete alongside the top tier's automatic entrants, which began its regular season later in the summer. The top teams at the end of the Division A regular season then proceeded to the Superfinal to contest the league title as usual. (see defunct formats for more)

Having switched from Monte Carlo to Marseille in 2005, BSWW made the French city the Superfinal's permanent new home for 2006 and 2007. Its impressive hosting was key in FIFA's decision to award the city as hosts of the 2008 World Cup. The EBSL continued to double as the World Cup qualification route for European nations into the FIFA era.

These years saw the Iberian nations return to the summit; Spain won their fifth title in 2006 and Portugal their second in 2007, narrowly denying France their own second crown by a single goal in the final. However the latter year saw the birth of a new European power, that of Russia who finished top of the Division A regular season table in just their first season in the top tier, ultimately finishing third in the Superfinal. This era saw the rise of the likes of Switzerland and Poland, establishing themselves as regular participants of the top tier.

Promotion and relegation (2009–present)
The 2008 season was greatly affected by the scheduling of the World Cup which shortened the league's calendar. Because of the time constraints, the incumbent format could not be implemented. Instead, all teams competed in one unified division in what was ultimately an anomalous season in terms of its format.

Heading into the 2009 season, BSWW did not return to the 2006–07 format but instead completely revamped the league's configuration, primarily introducing a system of promotion and relegation between Divisions A and B by making the Superfinal a Division A only event and establishing a second post-season event exclusively for Division B nations, the Promotion Final, in which promotion is achieved. The regular seasons of the two divisions were also reverted back to occur concurrently as in 2001–05. (see current format for more)

During this era participation has continued to increase, breaking the 20-team barrier in 2011 and a record 27 nations competed in 2017, seeing participation expand to some of Europe's least populated nations such as Lithuania and Andorra, and to the continent's most eastern periphery with Azerbaijan and Kazakhstan debuting and becoming league regulars. The Superfinal and regular season stages have also spread out further across Europe; the former has been staged in Estonia, The Netherlands and Russia, whilst the latter have been hosted in Serbia, Hungary and Ukraine. Russia's rise culminated with their first title in 2009; with four further titles since, Russia equalled Spain and Portugal's long standing record tally of five titles in 2017, and at least finishing in the top four every season from 2007–19, the Russians have cemented their position as a superpower. During this period Portugal have continued to be a dominant side, becoming only the second team after Spain (1999–2001) to win three titles in a row (2019–2022), to move clear as the record-holding champions, now with eight. Meanwhile, Switzerland and Ukraine claimed their maiden crowns, and Belarus have also broken into the elite by reaching their first final in 2021. On the other hand, this era has seen the demise of nations like France, who saw relegation to Division B in 2010 and again 2012, meanwhile Spain have only made two finals during these ten years, despite their five previous titles.

The 2020s began with a series of disruptions to the league. The COVID-19 pandemic severely impacted the 2020 season and also somewhat affected the 2021 season. And in 2022, longstanding and major league members, Russia and Belarus, were excluded from the competition in response to the Russian invasion of Ukraine.

Competition structure

Current format
In 2009, BSWW overhauled the existing league structure and introduced a new format that remains in use, featuring a system of promotion and relegation between two divisions of teams. The league currently consists of two phases – a regular season, typically taking place between June and August, and two post-season events, taking place in August or September. Minor amendments to the format were made in 2013 that focused on increasing the size of Division A and the number of teams advancing to the post-season events.

Divisions A and B
The nations of the EBSL are divided between two divisions; A, the league's top tier, and B, the league's lower tier. Each season, Division A nations aim to win the EBSL title, whilst Division B nations aim to be promoted to Division A, with one promotion spot available per season.

12 countries comprise Division A. These are the league's best teams. It features the top 11 finishers from the previous year's final Division A regular season league table, plus the one nation who earned promotion from Division B at end of the preceding season (the Promotion Final winners). Division B hosts all other participants, those with lesser ability on the sand than those in the top tier. The division features teams from the previous Division B season who were not promoted, nations returning after an absence from competing, the team relegated from Division A at the end of the previous season, and any debutants. Hence the total number of nations competing in Division B varies by season and as such is not fixed in size like Division A.

Regular season
The league begins with the regular season, consisting of multiple rounds of fixtures taking place every few weeks. Each set of matches is treated as its own event, known as a stage. Each stage of the season is hosted in a different European country. Typically, both Division A and Division B matches are organised to take place together during the same stage event. Overall, Division A nations generally take part in two stages per year and Division B nations, one stage each.

In each stage, the participating teams compete in groups of four in a round robin format (sometimes Division B nations play in groups of three) over the course of three days (usually Friday, Saturday and Sunday). Teams earn points for their divisions’ league table for winning matches during these stages, trying to earn enough to qualify for their respective divisions' post-season events (see below). The team who earned the most points during the event are declared stage winners and are presented with a trophy. Individual awards are also presented for the MVP, best goalkeeper and top scorer.

Superfinal
The post-season event for Division A teams is called the Superfinal. Of the 12 teams in Division A, the top eight ranking nations with the most points in the Division A league table at the end of the regular season proceed to the Superfinal. In this event, the participating nations directly compete for the league title. A four-day event, the eight teams are split into two groups of four, competing in a round robin format. The two group winners then proceed to the final, with the winner of this concluding match crowned champions of the EBSL.

Promotion Final
The post-season event for Division B nations is called the Promotion Final, staged in parallel with the Superfinal during same dates and in the same location. The top seven ranking nations with the most points in the Division B league table at the end of the regular season proceed to the Promotion Final. In this event, teams directly compete for the single promotion spot available. An eighth nation also takes part, the team that finished last in Division A, who compete to try and defend their Division A status.

The eight teams are split into two groups of four, competing in a round robin format. The two group winners then proceed to the final to play for promotion. The Division B nation which wins this match is promoted to Division A the next season, with the team bottom of Division A relegated. However, if the defending Division A team successfully wins the Promotion Final, fending off the challenge of the Division B teams, they will retain their Division A status for the next season, denying any prospective Division B team promotion.

Defunct formats

Locations of events

Part of the original concept of the EBSL was to link the multiple promoters of beach soccer in the different countries of Europe under the umbrella of a single Europe-wide competition. This was to ensure a strong structure of development for beach soccer throughout the Old Continent through such unity. This has meant that BSWW have hosted and continue to host EBSL events right across Europe.

The table below shows the countries which have hosted EBSL events, in order from that which has hosted the most, down to the least. The specific host towns and cities in each country are also listed. Overall, in 24 seasons, there have been 138 events hosted in 69 different locations in Europe.

Teams

As of the 2021 season, 24 teams comprise the Euro Beach Soccer League, split between two divisions: Division A consisting of 12 teams and Division B comprising 12 teams. Teams move between the divisions through a promotion and relegation process established in the 2009 season. One team a season can be promoted/relegated from each division. Prior to 2009, teams were simply allocated to divisions at the start of each season.

An eight team group from 2009 to 2012, the size of the top division has been fixed at 12 since 2013, seeing four extra teams promoted at the end of the 2012 season. However, teams returning after an absence from competing and new nations debuting are placed into the bottom division, hence its size, and the overall number nations participating in the league, has varied every season throughout the history of the competition.

Having started with seven nations in 1998 (France, Spain, Germany, Italy, Yugoslavia, Switzerland and Portugal), the milestone of 10 participating nations was reached in the 2002 season and 20 teams first took part in the 2011 season; the record is currently 27 teams, first achieved in the 2017 season. Overall, 36 different nations have competed since the opening edition. 20 members of UEFA are yet to enter the league. National teams such as Croatia, Malta and Slovenia have expressed interest in joining the league in the past, but have so far not participated.

Current line-up
2021 season results:

Inactive teams
Of the 36 nations that have competed at some point since the start of the EBSL, 12 are currently inactive – absent from competing in the league in recent years, but may return to compete again in the future. However, note that Monaco are not a FIFA member and so are not eligible to return to compete – their solo appearance in 2004 took place before FIFA became governing body of beach soccer.

Results

Season-by-season
The results shown were decided via the Superfinal since 2001 and via the end of season league table between 1998 and 2000.

The awards shown were presented after the Superfinal. However note that the awards presented to the players listed between 1998 and 2007 were based on those players' performances and goals amassed over the entire season. From 2008 onwards, season-encompassing awards were made defunct – the players listed received the awards based solely on their performance in the season-ending Superfinal.

Successful teams

Promoted and relegated teams (Promotion Final results)
The following table lists the results from the final match of the Promotion Final – the secondary post-season event in existence since 2009 from which the winner is promoted from Division B to Division A. (see Competition structure#Promotion Final for more)

The table also shows which defending Division A team failed to defend their place in the top tier during the Promotion Final and were therefore relegated (if applicable). The promoted teams are also listed because, in some seasons, more teams than simply the Promotion Final winners gained promotion. These special circumstances are explained via footnotes.

Statistics

Regular season stage winners
The first phase of the EBSL is the regular season. The matches of the regular season have been organised as both small-scale knockout tournaments and also round robin tournaments known as stages; the latter is the current format being used. The team which earns the most points at the end of the stage are declared stage winners and receive a trophy.

The following tables list every nation that has ever won a stage and how many stages in total they have won, by division. For comparison, the number of stages said team has ever played in that division in order to achieve the number of stage victories is also shown.

Division A
This table shows the teams which have won Division A regular season stages.

Division B
This table shows the teams which have won Division B regular season stages since the division was introduced in 2002.

Teams without a stage win
The following teams have previously competed in Division A or B but currently have zero stage victories in that division. The notes that apply to the above two tables also apply here.

Superfinal appearances
The Superfinal is the post-season event in which the nations with the most points at the end of the regular season qualify to play in, with the winner becoming league champions.

The table below lists all the teams who have ever qualified for Superfinal and the total number of times said team has appeared in the event.

Portugal are the only team to appear in all 22 Superfinals. Of the eight winners of the EBSL, Switzerland appeared in most Superfinals before finally winning the title, claiming the crown at their ninth attempt. Meanwhile, Poland and Belarus have appeared in the most Superfinals (seven) without yet winning the title.

All-time tables
Division or status in 2020:

Division A
The all-time Division A table is a cumulative record of all match results, points and goals of every team that has ever played whilst being a member of Division A of the EBSL.

Division B
The all-time Division B table is a cumulative record of all match results, points and goals of every team that has ever played whilst being a member of Division B of the EBSL since the division's establishment in 2002.

References
Notes

Citations

External links
Euro Beach Soccer League, at Beach Soccer Worldwide
Euro Beach Soccer League, at ZeroZero.pt (in Portuguese)

 
Beach soccer competitions
Recurring sporting events established in 1998
1998 establishments in Europe
FIFA Beach Soccer World Cup qualification